Ternovoye is a rural locality (a selo) in Korochansky District, Belgorod Oblast, Russia. The population was 210 as of 2010. There are 3 streets.

Geography 
Ternovoye is located 13 km south of Korocha (the district's administrative centre) by road. Afanasovo is the nearest rural locality.

References 

Rural localities in Korochansky District